Hapach was a king of Circassia (Zichia) in the 900s. Not much is known about Hapach's life or much of his reign.

Reign

Life and reign 
Not much is known about Hapach's life or much of his reign, only that he, with his army of horsemen and allied principalities, attacked Sarkel, a city of the Khazars, in the 900s. The Khazar army was defeated and the Sarkel prince and his surviving army were imprisoned.

Borders 
The exact borders of the kingdom during his reign is also unknown. In historical sources, the area first appears in the 6th century, when the Byzantine historian Procopius of Caesarea records that the people of the Zechoi used to have a king appointed by the Roman Emperor, but that they had since become independent. The Notitiae Episcopatuum of the Patriarchate of Constantinople mention an autocephalous archbishopric of Zichia from the 7th century on, associated with Tamatarcha or the Cimmerian Bosporus.

References 

Circassians
10th-century rulers in Europe